The following is a partial list of the "C" codes for Medical Subject Headings (MeSH), as defined by the United States National Library of Medicine (NLM).

This list continues the information at List of MeSH codes (C03). Codes following these are found at List of MeSH codes (C05). For other MeSH codes, see List of MeSH codes.

The source for this content is the set of 2006 MeSH Trees from the NLM.

– neoplasms

– cysts

– arachnoid cysts

– bone cysts
  – bone cysts, aneurysmal
  – jaw cysts
  – nonodontogenic cysts
  – odontogenic cysts
  – basal cell nevus syndrome
  – dentigerous cyst
  – odontogenic cyst, calcifying
  – periodontal cyst
  – radicular cyst

– branchioma

– breast cyst

– bronchogenic cyst

– chalazion

– choledochal cyst

– dermoid cyst

– epidermal cyst

– esophageal cyst

– follicular cyst

– ganglion cysts

– lymphocele

– mediastinal cyst

– mesenteric cyst

– mucocele

– ovarian cysts
  – polycystic ovary syndrome

– pancreatic cyst
  – pancreatic pseudocyst

– parovarian cyst

– pilonidal sinus

– ranula

– synovial cyst
  – popliteal cyst

– thyroglossal cyst

– urachal cyst

– hamartoma

– hamartoma syndrome, multiple

– proteus syndrome

– tuberous sclerosis

– neoplasms by histologic type

– histiocytic disorders, malignant
  – histiocytosis, malignant
  – leukemia, monocytic, acute
  – lymphoma, large-cell
  – lymphoma, large-cell, ki-1

– leukemia
  – enzootic bovine leukosis
  – leukemia, experimental
  – avian leukosis
  – leukemia L1210
  – leukemia L5178
  – leukemia p388
  – leukemia, feline
  – leukemia, hairy cell
  – leukemia, t-cell, htlv-ii-associated
  – leukemia, lymphocytic
  – leukemia, b-cell
  – leukemia, b-cell, acute
  – leukemia, B-Cell, chronic
  – leukemia, pre-b-cell
  – leukemia, lymphocytic, acute
  – leukemia, b-cell, acute
  – leukemia, calla-positive
  – leukemia, lymphocytic, acute, L1
  – leukemia, lymphocytic, acute, L2
  – leukemia, mixed-cell
  – leukemia, null-cell
  – leukemia, t-cell, acute
  – leukemia-lymphoma, t-cell, acute, htlv-i-associated
  – leukemia, lymphocytic, chronic
  – leukemia, B-Cell, chronic
  – leukemia, prolymphocytic
  – leukemia, T-Cell, chronic
  – leukemia, t-cell
  – leukemia, t-cell, acute
  – leukemia-lymphoma, t-cell, acute, htlv-i-associated
  – leukemia, T-Cell, chronic
  – leukemia, t-cell, htlv-ii-associated
  – leukemia, mast-cell
  – leukemia, myeloid
  – leukemia, myeloid, chronic
  – blast crisis
  – leukemia, monocytic, chronic
  – leukemia, myeloid, aggressive-phase
  – leukemia, myeloid, chronic-phase
  – leukemia, myelomonocytic, chronic
  – leukemia, neutrophilic, chronic
  – leukemia, myeloid, philadelphia-negative
  – leukemia, myeloid, philadelphia-positive
  – leukemia, myelomonocytic, acute
  – leukemia, nonlymphocytic, acute
  – leukemia, basophilic, acute
  – leukemia, eosinophilic, acute
  – leukemia, erythroblastic, acute
  – leukemia, mast-cell
  – leukemia, megakaryocytic, acute
  – leukemia, monocytic, acute
  – leukemia, myelocytic, acute
  – leukemia, promyelocytic, acute
  – sarcoma, granulocytic
  – leukemia, plasmacytic
  – leukemia, radiation-induced
  – leukemia, subleukemic

– lymphatic vessel tumors
  – lymphangioma
  – lymphangioma, cystic
  – lymphangiomyoma
  – lymphangioleiomyomatosis
  – lymphangiosarcoma

– lymphoma
  – histiocytosis, malignant
  – hodgkin disease
  – immunoproliferative small intestinal disease
  – lymphoma, non-hodgkin
  – B-cell lymphoma
  – burkitt lymphoma
  – lymphoma, aids-related
  – lymphoma, mucosa-associated lymphoid tissue
  – lymphoma, small-cell
  – lymphoma, diffuse
  – lymphoma, large-cell, diffuse
  – lymphoma, large-cell, immunoblastic
  – lymphoma, lymphoblastic
  – lymphoma, mixed-cell, diffuse
  – lymphoma, small cleaved-cell, diffuse
  – lymphoma, mantle-cell
  – lymphoma, small lymphocytic
  – lymphoma, small noncleaved-cell
  – lymphoma, follicular
  – lymphoma, large-cell, follicular
  – lymphoma, mixed-cell, follicular
  – lymphoma, small cleaved-cell, follicular
  – lymphoma, high-grade
  – lymphoma, large-cell, immunoblastic
  – lymphoma, lymphoblastic
  – lymphoma, small noncleaved-cell
  – burkitt lymphoma
  – lymphoma, intermediate-grade
  – lymphoma, large-cell, diffuse
  – lymphoma, large-cell, follicular
  – lymphoma, mixed-cell, diffuse
  – lymphoma, small cleaved-cell, diffuse
  – lymphoma, mantle-cell
  – lymphoma, large-cell
  – lymphoma, large-cell, diffuse
  – lymphoma, large-cell, follicular
  – lymphoma, large-cell, immunoblastic
  – lymphoma, large-cell, ki-1
  – lymphoma, lymphoblastic
  – lymphoma, low-grade
  – lymphoma, mixed-cell, follicular
  – lymphoma, mucosa-associated lymphoid tissue
  – lymphoma, small cleaved-cell, follicular
  – lymphoma, small lymphocytic
  – lymphoma, mixed-cell
  – lymphoma, mixed-cell, diffuse
  – lymphoma, mixed-cell, follicular
  – lymphoma, small-cell
  – lymphoma, small cleaved-cell, diffuse
  – lymphoma, mantle-cell
  – lymphoma, small cleaved-cell, follicular
  – lymphoma, small lymphocytic
  – lymphoma, small noncleaved-cell
  – lymphoma, t-cell
  – lymphoma, lymphoblastic
  – lymphoma, t-cell, cutaneous
  – lymphoma, large-cell, ki-1
  – mycosis fungoides
  – sezary syndrome
  – lymphoma, t-cell, peripheral
  – lymphoma, undifferentiated
  – lymphoma, large-cell, diffuse
  – lymphoma, small noncleaved-cell
  – burkitt lymphoma
  – plasmacytoma
  – multiple myeloma
  – reticuloendotheliosis
  – mast-cell sarcoma

– neoplasms, complex and mixed
  – adenolymphoma
  – adenoma, pleomorphic
  – adenomyoma
  – adenosarcoma
  – carcinoma, adenosquamous
  – carcinosarcoma
  – carcinoma 256, walker
  – hepatoblastoma
  – mesenchymoma
  – mixed tumor, malignant
  – mixed tumor, mesodermal
  – mixed tumor, mullerian
  – myoepithelioma
  – wilms tumor
  – denys-drash syndrome
  – wagr syndrome
  – nephroma, mesoblastic
  – pulmonary blastoma
  – rhabdoid tumor
  – sarcoma, endometrial stromal
  – thymoma

– neoplasms, connective and soft tissue
  – neoplasms, adipose tissue
  – angiolipoma
  – angiomyolipoma
  – lipoma
  – liposarcoma
  – liposarcoma, myxoid
  – myelolipoma
  – neoplasms, connective tissue
  – chondroblastoma
  – chondroma
  – chondromatosis
  – chondrosarcoma
  – chondrosarcoma, mesenchymal
  – giant cell tumors
  – giant cell tumor of bone
  – mastocytosis
  – mastocytoma
  – mastocytosis, cutaneous
  – urticaria pigmentosa
  – mastocytosis, systemic
  – leukemia, mast-cell
  – mast-cell sarcoma
  – myofibroma
  – myxoma
  – neurothekeoma
  – myxosarcoma
  – neoplasms, bone tissue
  – fibroma, ossifying
  – giant cell tumor of bone
  – osteoblastoma
  – osteochondroma
  – osteochondromatosis
  – exostoses, multiple hereditary
  – osteoma
  – osteoma, osteoid
  – osteosarcoma
  – osteosarcoma, juxtacortical
  – sarcoma, Ewing's
  – neoplasms, fibrous tissue
  – fibroma
  – fibroma, desmoplastic
  – fibroma, ossifying
  – fibromatosis, abdominal
  – fibromatosis, aggressive
  – fibrosarcoma
  – dermatofibrosarcoma
  – neurofibrosarcoma
  – histiocytoma
  – histiocytoma, benign fibrous
  – histiocytoma, malignant fibrous
  – myofibromatosis
  – neoplasms, fibroepithelial
  – adenofibroma
  – brenner tumor
  – fibroadenoma
  – sarcoma, clear cell
  – sarcoma, small cell
  – sarcoma, synovial
  – neoplasms, muscle tissue
  – granular cell tumor
  – leiomyoma
  – angiomyoma
  – leiomyoma, epithelioid
  – leiomyomatosis
  – leiomyosarcoma
  – myoma
  – rhabdomyoma
  – myosarcoma
  – rhabdomyosarcoma
  – rhabdomyosarcoma, alveolar
  – rhabdomyosarcoma, embryonal
  – sarcoma, alveolar soft part
  – smooth muscle tumor
  – sarcoma
  – adenosarcoma
  – carcinosarcoma
  – carcinoma 256, walker
  – chondrosarcoma
  – chondrosarcoma, mesenchymal
  – fibrosarcoma
  – dermatofibrosarcoma
  – neurofibrosarcoma
  – hemangiosarcoma
  – histiocytoma, malignant fibrous
  – leiomyosarcoma
  – liposarcoma
  – liposarcoma, myxoid
  – lymphangiosarcoma
  – mixed tumor, mesodermal
  – myosarcoma
  – rhabdomyosarcoma
  – rhabdomyosarcoma, alveolar
  – rhabdomyosarcoma, embryonal
  – myxosarcoma
  – osteosarcoma
  – osteosarcoma, juxtacortical
  – sarcoma, Ewing's
  – phyllodes tumor
  – sarcoma, alveolar soft part
  – sarcoma, clear cell
  – sarcoma, endometrial stromal
  – sarcoma, experimental
  – sarcoma 37
  – sarcoma 180
  – sarcoma, avian
  – sarcoma, yoshida
  – sarcoma, granulocytic
  – sarcoma, kaposi
  – sarcoma, small cell
  – sarcoma, synovial

– neoplasms, germ cell and embryonal
  – carcinoma, embryonal
  – chordoma
  – dermoid cyst
  – germinoma
  – dysgerminoma
  – seminoma
  – gonadoblastoma
  – mesonephroma
  – endodermal sinus tumor
  – neuroectodermal tumors
  – craniopharyngioma
  – neoplasms, neuroepithelial
  – ganglioneuroma
  – glioma
  – astrocytoma
  – glioblastoma
  – optic nerve glioma
  – ependymoma
  – glioma, subependymal
  – ganglioglioma
  – gliosarcoma
  – medulloblastoma
  – oligodendroglioma
  – optic nerve glioma
  – neurocytoma
  – neuroectodermal tumors, primitive
  – medulloblastoma
  – neuroectodermal tumors, primitive, peripheral
  – neuroblastoma
  – esthesioneuroblastoma, olfactory
  – ganglioneuroblastoma
  – pinealoma
  – retinoblastoma
  – neuroectodermal tumor, melanotic
  – neuroendocrine tumors
  – adenoma, acidophil
  – adenoma, basophil
  – adenoma, chromophobe
  – apudoma
  – carcinoid tumor
  – malignant carcinoid syndrome
  – carcinoid heart disease
  – carcinoma, neuroendocrine
  – carcinoma, medullary
  – carcinoma, merkel cell
  – carcinoma, small cell
  – somatostatinoma
  – vipoma
  – melanoma
  – hutchinson's melanotic freckle
  – melanoma, amelanotic
  – melanoma, experimental
  – neurilemmoma
  – neuroma, acoustic
  – neurofibromatosis 2
  – paraganglioma
  – paraganglioma, extra-adrenal
  – carotid body tumor
  – glomus jugulare tumor
  – glomus tympanicum tumor
  – pheochromocytoma
  – teratocarcinoma
  – teratoma
  – struma ovarii
  – trophoblastic neoplasms
  – choriocarcinoma
  – choriocarcinoma, non-gestational
  – trophoblastic tumor, placental site
  – gestational trophoblastic neoplasms
  – choriocarcinoma
  – trophoblastic tumor, placental site
  – hydatidiform mole
  – hydatidiform mole, invasive

– neoplasms, glandular and epithelial
  – adenoma
  – acth-secreting pituitary adenoma
  – adenoma, acidophil
  – adenoma, basophil
  – adenoma, bile duct
  – adenoma, chromophobe
  – adenoma, islet cell
  – insulinoma
  – adenoma, liver cell
  – adenoma, oxyphilic
  – adenoma, pleomorphic
  – adenoma, sweat gland
  – acrospiroma, eccrine
  – hidrocystoma
  – syringoma
  – adenoma, villous
  – adenomatoid tumor
  – adenomatosis, pulmonary
  – adenomatous polyps
  – adenomatous polyposis coli
  – gardner syndrome
  – adrenal rest tumor
  – apudoma
  – cystadenoma
  – cystadenoma, mucinous
  – cystadenoma, papillary
  – cystadenoma, serous
  – growth hormone-secreting pituitary adenoma
  – mesothelioma
  – mesothelioma, cystic
  – prolactinoma
  – carcinoma
  – adenocarcinoma
  – adenocarcinoma, bronchiolo-alveolar
  – adenocarcinoma, clear cell
  – adenocarcinoma, follicular
  – carcinoma, papillary, follicular
  – adenocarcinoma, mucinous
  – adenocarcinoma, papillary
  – carcinoma, papillary, follicular
  – adenocarcinoma, scirrhous
  – linitis plastica
  – adenocarcinoma, sebaceous
  – adrenocortical carcinoma
  – carcinoid tumor
  – malignant carcinoid syndrome
  – carcinoid heart disease
  – carcinoma, acinar cell
  – carcinoma, adenoid cystic
  – carcinoma, ductal
  – carcinoma, ductal, breast
  – carcinoma, pancreatic ductal
  – carcinoma, endometrioid
  – carcinoma, hepatocellular
  – carcinoma, intraductal, noninfiltrating
  – paget's disease, mammary
  – carcinoma, islet cell
  – gastrinoma
  – glucagonoma
  – carcinoma, lobular
  – carcinoma, mucoepidermoid
  – carcinoma, neuroendocrine
  – carcinoma, medullary
  – carcinoma, merkel cell
  – carcinoma, small cell
  – somatostatinoma
  – vipoma
  – carcinoma, renal cell
  – carcinoma, signet ring cell
  – krukenberg tumor
  – carcinoma, skin appendage
  – cholangiocarcinoma
  – choriocarcinoma
  – choriocarcinoma, non-gestational
  – trophoblastic tumor, placental site
  – cystadenocarcinoma
  – cystadenocarcinoma, mucinous
  – cystadenocarcinoma, papillary
  – cystadenocarcinoma, serous
  – klatskin's tumor
  – paget's disease, extramammary
  – pulmonary adenomatosis, ovine
  – carcinoma, adenosquamous
  – carcinoma, basal cell
  – basal cell nevus syndrome
  – carcinoma, basosquamous
  – carcinoma, ehrlich tumor
  – carcinoma, giant cell
  – carcinoma in situ
  – cervical intraepithelial neoplasia
  – prostatic intraepithelial neoplasia
  – carcinoma, krebs 2
  – carcinoma, large cell
  – carcinoma, lewis lung
  – carcinoma, non-small-cell lung
  – carcinoma, papillary
  – carcinoma, squamous cell
  – bowen's disease
  – carcinoma, transitional cell
  – carcinoma, verrucous
  – neoplasms, adnexal and skin appendage
  – adenocarcinoma, sebaceous
  – adenoma, sweat gland
  – acrospiroma, eccrine
  – hidrocystoma
  – syringoma
  – carcinoma, skin appendage
  – neoplasms, basal cell
  – carcinoma, basal cell
  – basal cell nevus syndrome
  – carcinoma, basosquamous
  – pilomatrixoma
  – neoplasms, cystic, mucinous, and serous
  – adenocarcinoma, mucinous
  – carcinoma, mucoepidermoid
  – carcinoma, signet ring cell
  – krukenberg tumor
  – cystadenocarcinoma
  – cystadenocarcinoma, mucinous
  – cystadenocarcinoma, papillary
  – cystadenocarcinoma, serous
  – cystadenoma
  – cystadenoma, mucinous
  – cystadenoma, papillary
  – cystadenoma, serous
  – mucoepidermoid tumor
  – pseudomyxoma peritonei
  – neoplasms, ductal, lobular, and medullary
  – carcinoma, ductal
  – carcinoma, ductal, breast
  – carcinoma, pancreatic ductal
  – carcinoma, intraductal, noninfiltrating
  – paget's disease, mammary
  – carcinoma, lobular
  – carcinoma, medullary
  – paget's disease, extramammary
  – papilloma, intraductal
  – neoplasms, fibroepithelial
  – adenofibroma
  – brenner tumor
  – fibroadenoma
  – neoplasms, mesothelial
  – adenomatoid tumor
  – mesothelioma
  – mesothelioma, cystic
  – neoplasms, neuroepithelial
  – ganglioneuroma
  – glioma
  – astrocytoma
  – glioblastoma
  – optic nerve glioma
  – ependymoma
  – glioma, subependymal
  – ganglioglioma
  – gliosarcoma
  – medulloblastoma
  – oligodendroglioma
  – optic nerve glioma
  – neurocytoma
  – neuroectodermal tumors, primitive
  – medulloblastoma
  – neuroectodermal tumors, primitive, peripheral
  – neuroblastoma
  – esthesioneuroblastoma, olfactory
  – ganglioneuroblastoma
  – pinealoma
  – retinoblastoma
  – neoplasms, squamous cell
  – acanthoma
  – carcinoma, papillary
  – carcinoma, squamous cell
  – bowen's disease
  – carcinoma, verrucous
  – papilloma
  – papilloma, inverted

– neoplasms, gonadal tissue
  – gonadoblastoma
  – sex cord-gonadal stromal tumors
  – granulosa cell tumor
  – luteoma
  – sertoli-leydig cell tumor
  – leydig cell tumor
  – sertoli cell tumor
  – thecoma

– neoplasms, nerve tissue
  – meningioma
  – nerve sheath neoplasms
  – neurilemmoma
  – neurofibroma
  – neurofibroma, plexiform
  – neurofibromatosis
  – neurofibromatosis 1
  – neurofibromatosis 2
  – neurofibrosarcoma
  – neurofibrosarcoma
  – neuroma
  – neurilemmoma
  – neuroma, acoustic
  – neurofibromatosis 2
  – neurothekeoma
  – neuroectodermal tumors
  – craniopharyngioma
  – neoplasms, neuroepithelial
  – ganglioneuroma
  – glioma
  – astrocytoma
  – glioblastoma
  – optic nerve glioma
  – ependymoma
  – glioma, subependymal
  – ganglioglioma
  – gliosarcoma
  – medulloblastoma
  – oligodendroglioma
  – optic nerve glioma
  – neurocytoma
  – neuroectodermal tumors, primitive
  – medulloblastoma
  – neuroectodermal tumors, primitive, peripheral
  – neuroblastoma
  – esthesioneuroblastoma, olfactory
  – ganglioneuroblastoma
  – pinealoma
  – retinoblastoma
  – neuroectodermal tumor, melanotic
  – neuroendocrine tumors
  – adenoma, acidophil
  – adenoma, basophil
  – adenoma, chromophobe
  – apudoma
  – carcinoid tumor
  – malignant carcinoid syndrome
  – carcinoid heart disease
  – carcinoma, neuroendocrine
  – carcinoma, medullary
  – carcinoma, merkel cell
  – carcinoma, small cell
  – melanoma
  – hutchinson's melanotic freckle
  – melanoma, amelanotic
  – melanoma, experimental
  – neurilemmoma
  – neuroma, acoustic
  – paraganglioma
  – paraganglioma, extra-adrenal
  – carotid body tumor
  – glomus jugulare tumor
  – glomus tympanicum tumor
  – pheochromocytoma

– neoplasms, vascular tissue
  – angiofibroma
  – angiokeratoma
  – glomus tumor
  – hemangioma
  – central nervous system venous angioma
  – hemangioendothelioma
  – hemangioendothelioma, epithelioid
  – hemangioma, capillary
  – hemangioblastoma
  – hemangioma, cavernous
  – hemangioma, cavernous, central nervous system
  – sturge-weber syndrome
  – hemangiopericytoma
  – hemangiosarcoma
  – meningioma
  – sarcoma, kaposi

– nevi and melanomas
  – melanoma
  – hutchinson's melanotic freckle
  – melanoma, amelanotic
  – melanoma, experimental
  – nevus
  – dysplastic nevus syndrome
  – nevus, intradermal
  – nevus, pigmented
  – mongolian spot
  – nevus, blue
  – nevus of ota
  – nevus, spindle cell
  – nevus, epithelioid and spindle cell

– odontogenic tumors
  – ameloblastoma
  – cementoma
  – odontogenic cyst, calcifying
  – odontogenic tumor, squamous
  – odontoma

– neoplasms by site

– abdominal neoplasms
  – peritoneal neoplasms
  – retroperitoneal neoplasms

– anal gland neoplasms

– bone neoplasms
  – adamantinoma
  – femoral neoplasms
  – skull neoplasms
  – jaw neoplasms
  – mandibular neoplasms
  – maxillary neoplasms
  – palatal neoplasms
  – nose neoplasms
  – orbital neoplasms
  – skull base neoplasms
  – spinal neoplasms

– breast neoplasms
  – breast neoplasms, male
  – carcinoma, ductal, breast
  – phyllodes tumor

– digestive system neoplasms
  – biliary tract neoplasms
  – bile duct neoplasms
  – common bile duct neoplasms
  – gallbladder neoplasms
  – gastrointestinal neoplasms
  – esophageal neoplasms
  – gastrointestinal stromal tumors
  – intestinal neoplasms
  – cecal neoplasms
  – appendiceal neoplasms
  – colorectal neoplasms
  – adenomatous polyposis coli
  – gardner syndrome
  – colonic neoplasms
  – adenomatous polyposis coli
  – gardner syndrome
  – sigmoid neoplasms
  – colorectal neoplasms, hereditary nonpolyposis
  – rectal neoplasms
  – anus neoplasms
  – anal gland neoplasms
  – duodenal neoplasms
  – ileal neoplasms
  – jejunal neoplasms
  – stomach neoplasms
  – liver neoplasms
  – adenoma, liver cell
  – carcinoma, hepatocellular
  – liver neoplasms, experimental
  – pancreatic neoplasms
  – adenoma, islet cell
  – insulinoma
  – carcinoma, islet cell
  – gastrinoma
  – glucagonoma
  – somatostatinoma
  – vipoma
  – carcinoma, pancreatic ductal
  – peritoneal neoplasms

– endocrine gland neoplasms
  – adrenal gland neoplasms
  – adrenal cortex neoplasms
  – adrenocortical adenoma
  – adrenocortical carcinoma
  – multiple endocrine neoplasia
  – multiple endocrine neoplasia type 1
  – multiple endocrine neoplasia type 2a
  – multiple endocrine neoplasia type 2b
  – pancreatic neoplasms
  – adenoma, islet cell
  – insulinoma
  – carcinoma, islet cell
  – gastrinoma
  – glucagonoma
  – somatostatinoma
  – vipoma
  – carcinoma, pancreatic ductal
  – ovarian neoplasms
  – granulosa cell tumor
  – luteoma
  – meigs syndrome
  – sertoli-leydig cell tumor
  – thecoma
  – paraneoplastic endocrine syndromes
  – parathyroid neoplasms
  – pituitary neoplasms
  – acth-secreting pituitary adenoma
  – nelson syndrome
  – growth hormone-secreting pituitary adenoma
  – prolactinoma
  – testicular neoplasms
  – sertoli-leydig cell tumor
  – thyroid neoplasms
  – thyroid nodule

– eye neoplasms
  – conjunctival neoplasms
  – orbital neoplasms
  – retinal neoplasms
  – retinoblastoma
  – uveal neoplasms
  – choroid neoplasms
  – iris neoplasms

– head and neck neoplasms
  – esophageal neoplasms
  – facial neoplasms
  – eyelid neoplasms
  – mouth neoplasms
  – gingival neoplasms
  – leukoplakia, oral
  – leukoplakia, hairy
  – lip neoplasms
  – palatal neoplasms
  – salivary gland neoplasms
  – parotid neoplasms
  – sublingual gland neoplasms
  – submandibular gland neoplasms
  – tongue neoplasms
  – otorhinolaryngologic neoplasms
  – ear neoplasms
  – laryngeal neoplasms
  – nose neoplasms
  – paranasal sinus neoplasms
  – maxillary sinus neoplasms
  – pharyngeal neoplasms
  – hypopharyngeal neoplasms
  – nasopharyngeal neoplasms
  – oropharyngeal neoplasms
  – tonsillar neoplasms
  – parathyroid neoplasms
  – thyroid neoplasms
  – thyroid nodule
  – tracheal neoplasms

– hematologic neoplasms
  – bone marrow neoplasms

– mammary neoplasms, animal
  – mammary neoplasms, experimental

– nervous system neoplasms
  – central nervous system neoplasms
  – brain neoplasms
  – cerebral ventricle neoplasms
  – choroid plexus neoplasms
  – papilloma, choroid plexus
  – infratentorial neoplasms
  – brain stem neoplasms
  – cerebellar neoplasms
  – neurocytoma
  – pinealoma
  – supratentorial neoplasms
  – hypothalamic neoplasms
  – pituitary neoplasms
  – central nervous system cysts
  – arachnoid cysts
  – meningeal neoplasms
  – meningioma
  – spinal cord neoplasms
  – epidural neoplasms
  – cranial nerve neoplasms
  – optic nerve neoplasms
  – optic nerve glioma
  – neuroma, acoustic
  – neurofibromatosis 2
  – paraneoplastic syndromes, nervous system
  – lambert-eaton myasthenic syndrome
  – limbic encephalitis
  – myelitis, transverse
  – paraneoplastic cerebellar degeneration
  – paraneoplastic polyneuropathy
  – peripheral nervous system neoplasms
  – cranial nerve neoplasms
  – neuroma, acoustic
  – optic nerve neoplasms
  – optic nerve glioma

– pelvic neoplasms

– skin neoplasms
  – acanthoma
  – sebaceous gland neoplasms
  – sweat gland neoplasms

– soft tissue neoplasms
  – muscle neoplasms
  – vascular neoplasms

– splenic neoplasms

– thoracic neoplasms
  – heart neoplasms
  – mediastinal neoplasms
  – respiratory tract neoplasms
  – bronchial neoplasms
  – lung neoplasms
  – carcinoma, bronchogenic
  – carcinoma, non-small-cell lung
  – carcinoma, small cell
  – coin lesion, pulmonary
  – pancoast's syndrome
  – pulmonary blastoma
  – pulmonary sclerosing hemangioma
  – pleural neoplasms
  – pleural effusion, malignant
  – tracheal neoplasms
  – thymus neoplasms
  – thymoma

– urogenital neoplasms
  – genital neoplasms, female
  – fallopian tube neoplasms
  – uterine neoplasms
  – endometrial neoplasms
  – carcinoma, endometrioid
  – endometrial stromal tumors
  – sarcoma, endometrial stromal
  – uterine cervical neoplasms
  – vaginal neoplasms
  – vulvar neoplasms
  – genital neoplasms, male
  – penile neoplasms
  – prostatic neoplasms
  – testicular neoplasms
  – urologic neoplasms
  – bladder neoplasms
  – kidney neoplasms
  – carcinoma, renal cell
  – wilms tumor
  – denys-drash syndrome
  – wagr syndrome
  – nephroma, mesoblastic
  – ureteral neoplasms
  – urethral neoplasms
  – venereal tumors, veterinary

– neoplasms, experimental

– carcinoma 256, walker

– carcinoma, brown-pearce

– carcinoma, ehrlich tumor

– carcinoma, krebs 2

– carcinoma, lewis lung

– leukemia, experimental
  – avian leukosis
  – leukemia L1210
  – leukemia L5178
  – leukemia p388

– liver neoplasms, experimental

– mammary neoplasms, experimental

– melanoma, experimental

– sarcoma, experimental
  – sarcoma 37
  – sarcoma 180
  – sarcoma, avian
  – sarcoma, yoshida

– tumor virus infections
  – avian leukosis
  – epstein-barr virus infections
  – burkitt lymphoma
  – marek disease
  – sarcoma, avian

– neoplasms, hormone-dependent

– neoplasms, multiple primary

– hamartoma syndrome, multiple

– lipomatosis, multiple symmetrical

– multiple endocrine neoplasia
  – multiple endocrine neoplasia type 1
  – multiple endocrine neoplasia type 2a
  – multiple endocrine neoplasia type 2b

– proteus syndrome

– neoplasms, post-traumatic

– neoplasms, radiation-induced

– leukemia, radiation-induced

– neoplasms, second primary

– neoplastic processes

– anaplasia

– cell transformation, neoplastic
  – blast crisis
  – cell transformation, viral

– cocarcinogenesis

– neoplasm invasiveness
  – leukemic infiltration

– neoplasm metastasis
  – lymphatic metastasis
  – neoplasm circulating cells
  – neoplasm seeding
  – neoplasms, unknown primary

– neoplasm recurrence, local

– neoplasm regression, spontaneous

– neoplasm, residual

– neoplastic syndromes, hereditary

– adenomatous polyposis coli
  – gardner syndrome

– basal cell nevus syndrome

– colorectal neoplasms, hereditary nonpolyposis

– dysplastic nevus syndrome

– exostoses, multiple hereditary

– hamartoma syndrome, multiple

– li-fraumeni syndrome

– multiple endocrine neoplasia
  – multiple endocrine neoplasia type 1
  – multiple endocrine neoplasia type 2a
  – multiple endocrine neoplasia type 2b

– wilms tumor
  – denys-drash syndrome
  – wagr syndrome

– neurofibromatosis
  – neurofibromatosis 1
  – neurofibromatosis 2

– peutz-jeghers syndrome

– sturge-weber syndrome

– paraneoplastic syndromes

– paraneoplastic endocrine syndromes
  – acth syndrome, ectopic
  – zollinger-ellison syndrome

– paraneoplastic syndromes, nervous system
  – lambert-eaton myasthenic syndrome
  – limbic encephalitis
  – myelitis, transverse
  – paraneoplastic cerebellar degeneration
  – paraneoplastic polyneuropathy

– precancerous conditions

– erythroplasia

– leukoplakia
  – leukoplakia, oral
  – leukoplakia, hairy

– lymphomatoid granulomatosis

– lymphomatoid papulosis

– preleukemia

– uterine cervical dysplasia

– xeroderma pigmentosum

– pregnancy complications, neoplastic

– trophoblastic neoplasms
  – gestational trophoblastic neoplasms
  – choriocarcinoma
  – trophoblastic tumor, placental site
  – hydatidiform mole
  – hydatidiform mole, invasive

– tumor virus infections

– avian leukosis

– epstein-barr virus infections
  – burkitt lymphoma

– marek disease

– sarcoma, avian

– warts
  – epidermodysplasia verruciformis

The list continues at List of MeSH codes (C05).

C04